Unvanquished or The Unvanquished may refer to:

 The Unvanquished, 1938 novel by American author William Faulkner
 Aparajito, also called The Unvanquished, 1956 Bengali-language Indian film
 The Unvanquished (film), 1964 French film noir, original title L'Insoumis
"Unvanquished", episode of American science fiction TV series Caprica (See List of Caprica episodes)
 Unvanquished, a video game

See also
 Unvanquished City, 1950 Polish film
 Unconquered, 1947 American film
 Invicta (disambiguation)
 Invictus (disambiguation)